The 2013 Giro d'Italia began on 4 May, and stage 11 occurred on 15 May. The 2013 edition began with a road stage, for the first time since 2003, around Naples before a team time trial took place the following day on the island of Ischia. The rest of the opening half of the race – remaining within Italy for the duration – consisted of medium-mountain stages, save for two categorised flat stages and the first of two individual time trials during the event; the -long eighth stage between Gabicce Mare and Saltara, where each remaining member of the starting peloton of 207 riders competed against the clock.

Mark Cavendish became the first race leader, as he won the opening stage in Naples; the first of two stage wins that Cavendish achieved during the opening half of the race, along with the sixth stage. As a result, Cavendish was the only rider to win multiple stages in the opening half of the race. Cavendish lost the race lead the following day, as his  team failed to a sufficient time for him to remain in the jersey.  won the stage, which put Salvatore Puccio into the maglia rosa after he had placed highest during the opening stage, out of the five remaining members of the  train at the finish. Luca Paolini soloed into the leader's jersey after the third stage, attacking with  remaining and held clear of the field to win by sixteen seconds. He held the leader's jersey for four days, before losing it on the seventh stage, held in heavy rain.

On that stage, Adam Hansen – a rider who had completed all three Grand Tours in 2012 – took the honours by over a minute from a stage-long breakaway, while Beñat Intxausti was able to take the leader's jersey after finishing in the group of the overall favourites for the race. Intxausti's weakness in the time trial discipline saw him surrender the lead the following day, losing three and a half minutes to the stage winner, team-mate Alex Dowsett. Vincenzo Nibali – a previous Grand Tour winner at the 2010 Vuelta a España – assumed the race lead, and held the lead to the end of the eleventh stage, which marked the halfway point of the race. Nibali had ended the time trial 29 seconds clear of closest challenger Cadel Evans, but he gained twelve bonus seconds on the tenth stage, the race's first summit finish, to extend his advantage to 41 seconds with the more mountainous second half of the Giro still to come.

Stage 1
4 May 2013 — Naples to Naples, 

For the first time since the 2003 edition of the race, the Giro d'Italia began with a mass-start stage rather than a time trial test against the clock. Naples was announced as the starting location for the race in June 2012, with the 2013 race marking the 50th anniversary of the race's only other start in Naples; on that occasion, Vittorio Adorni soloed to victory in Potenza. The opening stage of the 2013 Giro was a circuit race in and around Naples, with two different circuits being utilised. Four laps of a -long circuit were completed first, with two ascents of a fourth-category climb providing any potential breakaways with the opportunity of claiming the mountains jersey on the opening day. With no major tests on the stage, it was widely expected to end in a sprint finish.

Almost immediately after the race began, the breakaway was formed, with seven riders attempting to work together in order to create a sizable advantage over the field, but could not muster an advantage of much over two minutes. The 's Giovanni Visconti and Cameron Wurf of  each led the breakaway over the summit of the climb, with Guillaume Bonnafond also achieving three points through minor placings on both ascents. This meant that the first maglia azzurra would be settled in the final sprint.

Several late crashes split the field into many groups, the last of which came inside the final , ensuring that the majority of the field would receive the same time as the stage winner. For the final sprint, it came down to a select group of sprinters;  sat on the front with the lead-out for Matthew Goss, but Elia Viviani and 's Mark Cavendish moved ahead, with Cavendish ultimately taking the victory on the line by almost a bike length. With his 37th Grand Tour stage win, moving him into a tie for eighth place on the all-time list with Rik Van Looy, Cavendish picked up the pink and red jerseys on the podium as leader of the general and points classifications. Although disappointed with losing the sprint, Viviani became the first white jersey wearer as young rider leader, and Visconti placed highest in the sprint to take the mountains lead.

Stage 2
5 May 2013 — Ischia to Forio, team time trial (TTT)

For the second stage of the race, the peloton was ferried over to the volcanic island of Ischia, which was hosting the Giro d'Italia for the first time in 54 years. The start order for the stage was primarily set by the reverse order of how each of the 23 teams were ranked in the Trofeo Fast Team standings after the previous day's opening stage; the only exception was that  would set off last, as Mark Cavendish was in possession of the maglia rosa, as the general classification leader.

 were the first team to start – each team setting off thereafter, at three-minute intervals – and only shed one rider from their train by the time they reached the finish in a time of 23' 01", but that time was beaten by the next squad on the course, as  went below 23 minutes, recording a time of 22' 55".  were next onto the stage, and were comfortably quicker, as they were 22 seconds faster for the course. Their time was not beaten until  hit the course, and despite early problems for several of their team, they came across the line in a time of 22' 05". As it turned out, the time was not to be beaten, giving the squad their second team time trial victory of the season after a victory in the discipline at the Giro del Trentino. By the end of the stage, only one team – the  – remained within ten seconds, having recorded a quicker time, by two seconds, to the intermediate point in Casamicciola Terme. As a result, Salvatore Puccio became the race leader, as of the five remaining members of the  train at the finish, he had placed highest on the opening stage.

Stage 3
6 May 2013 — Sorrento to Marina di Ascea, 

Back on the mainland after its foray to Ischia, the third stage of the 2013 Giro was split into three distinct sections. From the start in Sorrento, the peloton completed two circuits of a  loop before making an undulating way along the Amalfi coast to Salerno. Upon reaching Salerno – where the first of two intermediate sprint points was held, along with one at Agropoli – the route remained relatively flat for the next . From the top of the Sella di Catona, there was a near- descent into the finish town of Ascea.

The day's breakaway was formed immediately after the start in Sorrento, with seven riders going clear to establish an advantage; the best of which was Fabio Taborre of the  team, who trailed the overall leader Salvatore Puccio by 22 seconds overnight. Despite this, the septet was allowed to establish an advantage of over seven minutes at its maximum. On the San Mauro Cilento, the breakaway was down to six riders as Bert De Backer lost contact with his companions.  rider Willem Wauters led over the climb, while the peloton came across the top around 3' 45" down on the lead sextet, with De Backer in between.

Taborre attacked on the descent from the climb, gaining an advantage of over a minute at one point, reaching the foot of the Sella di Catona with such a lead.  upped the pace in the peloton, which enabled the group to overcome the remnants of the breakaway group, and at one point, caused a fracture in the main field which saw a group of overall contenders including Ryder Hesjedal, Vincenzo Nibali, Bradley Wiggins and Michele Scarponi to get clear. Hesjedal then attacked solo from this group, passing Taborre, before slowing up and returned to the main group. On the descent, Nibali's  team-mate Valerio Agnoli pushed on and had Hesjedal and 's Luca Paolini join him. This group was brought back, with  keeping the pace high. Paolini attacked again with around  remaining, and was not to be caught, taking his first stage win in his début Giro, and the maglia rosa from Puccio, who lost seven minutes.  rider Cadel Evans led home a sixteen-rider select group sixteen seconds behind, ahead of Hesjedal.

Stage 4
7 May 2013 — Policastro Bussentino to Serra San Bruno, 

The race continued to make its way along the coast of the Tyrrhenian Sea, heading southwards to the southernmost point of the 2013 Giro d'Italia with the finish in Serra San Bruno. The stage was predominantly flat, with only the final quarter of the stage involving sizable shifts in altitude, with two categorised climbs as part of the parcours, for the second day in succession. A descent of almost  followed towards the finish in Serra San Bruno, with most of the final kilometre being run on cobblestones.

The group managed to build up an advantage of around eight minutes at one point during the stage. Paolini's team maintained their presence at the front of the peloton, cutting the advantage by half by the time the race reached the  mark. The lead group split at this point, with Sella, Ioannis Tamouridis and 's Anthony Roux gradually falling back to the main group. The lead then went back up to 5' 10", before falling substantially prior to the first climb of the day, the Vibo Valentia, to about one minute.

Tamouridis' team-mate Miguel Mínguez attacked on the climb, and was the last member of the breakaway to be brought back by the main field, eventually doing so with  remaining. There were several mini-attacks from there, lasting all the way to the foot of the other climb, the Croce Ferrata, where 's Sylvain Georges attacked out of a six-rider move at the bottom; he managed to establish a maximum lead of over a minute, before  moved to the front of the peloton. 's Danilo Di Luca and Robinson Chalapud attacked out of the peloton and soon passed Georges on the road, maintaining a small gap over the main field. Di Luca launched a long sprint for the line, doing so from around  out, and was not caught until  to go. From there, 's Enrico Battaglin finished strongest to take the biggest win of his short professional career, by two lengths ahead of Sella's team-mate Fabio Felline and the 's Giovanni Visconti, who had earlier done enough to regain the mountains classification lead. Paolini retained the maglia rosa after finishing tenth on the stage.

Stage 5
8 May 2013 — Cosenza to Matera, 

From there, the race meandered its way back to coastal roads, taking in intermediate sprint points at Villapiana Lido and Rocca Imperiale. With around  remaining, the route turned away from the coast, and headed towards the finish town of Matera. On the run-in was another fourth-category climb at Montescaglioso, before a gradual uphill finish in Matera; the roads rose by 2.6% within the final kilometre before the finish on the Via Dante Alighieri. It was expected to disadvantage out-and-out sprinters, but favour sprinters with climbing capabilities, such as 's John Degenkolb, and  rider Matthew Goss.

Six riders formed the primary breakaway for the day, establishing their advantage from the  points onwards. The best placed of the sextet was Stefano Pirazzi of the  team, who trailed overall leader Luca Paolini by just over three minutes overnight; after he claimed maximum points at the first climb at Cipolletto, Pirazzi sat up from the lead group and returned the peloton. After Pirazzi dropped back, the peloton slowed their pace substantially, and the five-man lead group were allowed to build up a lead of almost ten minutes on the stage. The weather changed on the route; having started in bright sunshine, heavy rain hit the peloton with around  making conditions treacherous on the roads. The lead group's advantage was continually brought back on the route, holding a lead of just over 30 seconds by the time they reached the final climb at Montescaglioso.

Pirazzi attacked on the climb in the hope of gaining more points to the mountains classification – ultimately crossing the summit in first position – but was joined on the descent by 's Ben Gastauer. Gastauer soon left Pirazzi behind and was joined by Mestre's team-mate Robert Vrečer.  rider Lars Bak also provided assistance to the group within the final , but the trio were ultimately caught.

Stage 6
9 May 2013 — Mola di Bari to Margherita di Savoia, 

The sixth stage of the Giro d'Italia was seen as one of the most sprinter-friendly stages of the race, with the parcours being run largely at sea level, on the coast of the Adriatic Sea. The course meandered inland after the second of the day's intermediate sprint points at Barletta – the first coming  prior in the town of Trani – with a slight ascent of a small hill, but nothing categorised towards the mountains classification. The route headed back to the coast for the finish in Margherita di Savoia, where around two-and-a-half laps of a -long circuit were completed before the expected sprint finish. The day's breakaway was all-Australian, as 's Jack Bobridge was joined by Cameron Wurf of  – who featured in the breakaway on the opening day – as they got clear after numerous smaller attacks had been brought back within the opening , gaining an advantage of six and a half minutes at one point during the stage, before the sprinters' teams started the chase.

Wurf's team-mates were twice able to launch Elia Viviani to gain points on 's Mark Cavendish, in relation to the points classification, at each of the intermediate sprint points. Prior to the first passage through the finish line, the two leaders were brought back and almost immediately after, there was a large crash in the main field, which blocked the road momentarily. The group split, but ultimately came back together within  and set up the sprint finish.  led into the final kilometre, but  soon came to the fore with Gert Steegmans launching Cavendish for his second stage win of the race, and his 38th Grand Tour stage win. After praising the lead-out of his team-mates, Cavendish dedicated his victory on the podium to Wouter Weylandt, by holding a dossard with the number 108 on it, the number Weylandt had been competing with during the 2011 Giro d'Italia, when he was killed during the third stage, held on 9 May. He also regained the lead of the points classification from overall leader Luca Paolini, who maintained the maglia rosa.

Stage 7
10 May 2013 — Marina di San Salvo to Pescara, 

An undulating parcours of  awaited the riders for the seventh stage of the 2013 Giro d'Italia, starting and finishing on the coast of the Adriatic Sea. However, most of the day's action was scheduled for inland, and in the second half of the stage; within the final , there were four categorised climbs – two third-category and two fourth-category ascents respectively – as well as the day's two intermediate sprints, coming in Chieti (most notably, a frequent stage finishing town for the early-season Tirreno–Adriatico stage race) and in Chieti Scalo.

The sextet built up a lead of almost seven and a half minutes around halfway through the stage, before Taborre and his team-mates – as well as Paolini's team – set about trying to reduce the lead. Rain was also making riding conditions difficult, with Sella being caught out while cornering; Hansen waited for his fellow escapee before regaining the momentum to gap the main field. Hansen was able to drop Sella on the third of the four climbs, the third-category, 5.9% average gradient ascent of the Santa Maria de Criptis, reaching the top of the climb with an advantage of some 30 seconds.

In the main field, 's Tanel Kangert and  rider Danilo Di Luca both launched combative moves off the front, while at the bottom of the final climb, Kangert's team-mate Vincenzo Nibali fell to the ground due to the slippery conditions. The main field had split at this point, with  missing the junction, leaving Bradley Wiggins in a chasing group. Sella – who was in between the lead and the peloton – crashed with around  remaining, with the same corner later catching out Wiggins, who later elected to gingerly descend the rest of the hill, losing more time to the main group. At the front, Hansen – who completed all three Grand Tours in 2012 – was still out front and soloed away to his first win since 2010. A 27-rider group came across the line just over a minute later, with 's Enrico Battaglin leading the group. The majority of the race favourites were within this group, with the exception of Wiggins, who lost nearly 90 seconds more than that, dropping outside the top 20 overall. Paolini was also in that group, and thus surrendered the lead of the race to the 's Beñat Intxausti, with Nibali and 's Ryder Hesjedal within ten seconds ahead of the following day's time trial.

Stage 8
11 May 2013 — Gabicce Mare to Saltara, individual time trial (ITT)

The first of two individual time trials to be held in the 2013 Giro d'Italia, the eighth stage was the longest such test against the clock to feature in the race since 2009. On that occasion, then- rider Denis Menchov won the stage after completing the  course, in the Cinque Terre, in a time just over 94 minutes. The Marche region played host to the  parcours, with a twisty, technical course, but not overly mountainous unlike 2009. The final  of the course was also set to test the riders; from the second intermediate time-check in Calcinelli, the riders steadily climbed towards the finish at the Villa del Balì in Saltara, with an 11.2% average gradient climb coming within the final kilometre. As was customary of time trial stages, the riders set off in reverse order from where they were ranked in the general classification at the end of the previous stage.

Although Bobridge was first into the stage, he was not the first to finish, as 's Maxim Belkov – who started the stage three minutes behind Bobridge, at one-minute intervals – recorded a time of one hour, twenty-one minutes and thirty-two seconds for the course; Bobridge finished three minutes further later, losing six minutes in total to Belkov. Belkov's time remained at the top of the time-sheets for around fifteen minutes before  rider Jesse Sergent took over at the top, beating Belkov's time by 3' 05". Again, Sergent held the top spot for around the same length of time as what Belkov did, before the eventual stage-winning time was recorded. British national champion Alex Dowsett set the fastest time at each of the intermediate splits, and ultimately recorded a time exactly two minutes quicker than Sergent, in a time of one hour, sixteen minutes and twenty-seven seconds. In his début Grand Tour, Dowsett achieved his first stage victory since the 2011 Tour of Britain, also in an individual time trial.

Among the overall contenders, 's Bradley Wiggins was considered as the pre-stage favourite, but was not expected to take the maglia rosa after losing time the previous day into Pescara. Wiggins caught his minute-man Danilo Di Luca in the early part of the stage, but he had stop several minutes later with a puncture; he threw his bike to the ground, before receiving a new bike from his mechanics. Although he was 52 seconds down on Dowsett at the first split, Wiggins had reduced the gap to just 10 at the finish, which was the closest anyone got to Dowsett. 's Michele Scarponi put in a solid performance to lose just 43 seconds to Wiggins, while the 's Cadel Evans lost 29 to remain 47 seconds ahead of him, in the overall classification. Evans also moved up to second overall, as 's Vincenzo Nibali became the new leader. Nibali went quicker than Dowsett to the first intermediate, but faded in the second portion of the course, finishing fourth on the stage – just behind team-mate Tanel Kangert – losing eleven seconds to Wiggins, but maintained a 1' 16" lead over him overall.

Stage 9
12 May 2013 — Sansepolcro to Firenze, 

The ninth stage of the 2013 Giro d'Italia was the last to be contested before the first of two rest days to be held during the race, the following day. With an itinerary of  through the mountains of Tuscany, it was to be expected that the breakaway would have a chance to achieve another stage victory, on roads expected to feature in September's UCI Road World Championships due to be held in the region. The parcours had a mix of categorised climbs throughout; for the four categorised climbs during the stage, each of the four categorisations available to the race organisers for ascents was implemented. Two punchy climbs followed; the third-category Vetta le Croci averaged over 9% during the  climb, while the Fiesole averaged 5.7%, before a  run to the finish in Florence.

After an earlier seven-rider move had been brought back early in the stage, the day's breakaway came about at the  point, with a group swelling to twelve riders going clear; the best placed among the group was 's Juan Manuel Gárate, who trailed overall leader Vincenzo Nibali by 5' 42" overnight. The lead group split on the day's first climb, the Consuma Pass, when 's Robinson Chalapud attacked along with Stefano Pirazzi of the  team, with the duo being joined by  rider Maxim Belkov on the descent from the climb. The trio were continuing to extend their lead over the main field, holding an advantage of over five minutes at that point. Belkov lost time on the second climb – where Pirazzi led Chalapud over the top again, in order to boost his position in the mountains classification – but was able to rejoin on the descent, once more.

Once Belkov had rejoined, he did not stay around long, accelerating down the road from Pirazzi and Chalapud. He had established an advantage of almost two minutes by the time that another three riders had joined up with Pirazzi and Chalapud, with around  remaining of the stage; the chase group soon expanded to nine riders chasing after Belkov, who was over three and a half minutes clear with  remaining. Belkov tired in the closing stages, but still did enough to win the stage by 44 seconds for his first professional victory. Behind, Jarlinson Pantano and 's Tobias Ludvigsson had attacked out of the chase group, and had vainly set off in pursuit of Belkov. Both riders were ultimately beaten to the line by 's Carlos Betancur, who attacked out of the peloton on the final climb; he mistakenly believed that he had won the stage, celebrating as he came across the line. Pantano beat Ludvigsson for third, while Cadel Evans led home the group of overall contenders not long after, taking the points classification lead in the process.

Stage 10
14 May 2013 — Cordenons to Altopiano del Montasio, 

The race's first summit finish was key to its resumption after the first rest day the previous day; the  parcours from Cordenons started with a gradual climb out of the starting town, with several small hills in the opening half of the stage. From there, the riders began the climb of the Passo Cason di Lanza – a  ascent from the bottom to the top, but with a downhill portion of just over  – averaging a gradient of around 8.5%. A long gradual descent followed, towards the town of Chiusaforte before the ascent of the Altopiano del Montasio. After a sustained approach, the climb of  ramped up immediately with 14% sections – sections reached 20% near the top of the climb – with the average being around 8%. The final kilometre was a false flat, averaging 3.2%, before the finish at  up.

A group of thirteen riders formed the day's breakaway, with the group being initiated at the  mark of the stage, with their advantage over the main field reaching a maximum of around nine minutes at the mid-stage point.  moved to the front of the peloton as the first climb began, while at the front of the race,  rider Jackson Rodríguez attacked on his own. The numbers in the peloton had reduced significantly thanks to the pace being set, before Rodríguez's team-mate Franco Pellizotti attacked from the group, beginning a chase of the leaders. Following his difficulties to remain with the overall contenders on the previous stage, defending Giro winner Ryder Hesjedal again struggled to remain in contention, cracking on the climb. He lost almost 21 minutes by the stage's end.

This gap was wiped out before the steeper segments of the climb had commenced, with around  remaining. Rigoberto Urán attacked several kilometres later, with  forced to try and chase down the move for race leader Vincenzo Nibali, through domestique Valerio Agnoli. Urán held a lead of around 50 seconds at one point during his attack, and ultimately soloed away to the stage victory. With eight bonus seconds gained at the line, Nibali extended his overall lead to 41 seconds over 's Cadel Evans, while Urán moved ahead of team-mate Bradley Wiggins into third place, by one second.

Stage 11
15 May 2013 — Tarvisio–Cave del Predil to Vajont–Erto e Casso, 

Having made their way through the feed zone at Ovaro – at the foot of the Monte Zoncolan, which featured in 2011 – the riders ascented the second-category Sella Ciampigotto, a rolling climb of around 4.5% in gradient. From there, the riders descended through the two intermediate sprint points – at Lozzo di Cadore and Pieve di Cadore – before the final kick up to the finish at Erto e Casso. The final climb was another rolling climb, with an average of around 5%, but the climb itself maxed out at 9% in places. The Vajont stage was held to commemorate victims of the Vajont Dam disaster in 1963, when a landslide caused major flooding in the Piave Valley, and the deaths of around 2,000 people.

Prior to the start, it was announced that  rider Sylvain Georges – who had been lying 81st overall – had tested positive for heptaminol after the seventh stage, and he failed to start the stage. With descending key to the first hour of racing, the peloton remained together for the duration, before a twenty-rider breakaway group was allowed to form at the  mark; 20 of the 23 teams that started the race were represented, with only ,  and  not represented. The highest placed rider within the group was 's Danilo Di Luca, who trailed overnight leader Vincenzo Nibali by almost fourteen minutes overnight. The group built up a lead of around five minutes at the halfway point, prior to the day's first climb.

 rider Patrick Gretsch attacked the group, and set off to an advantage which eventually reached almost two minutes prior to the final climb. Gretsch struggled to contribute to the pace, and ultimately cracked prior to the final climb. Pirazzi broke away from the chasing group to take third – further extending his mountains lead – while the remainder of the group came home in small packs. The peloton came home almost six minutes down, although the 's Beñat Intxausti was able to gain some time on the other overall contenders; a gap of 18 seconds was enough for Intxausti to move back into the top ten overall.

Notes

References

2013 Giro d'Italia
Giro d'Italia stages